The 1957 Tasmanian Australian National Football League (TANFL) premiership season was an Australian Rules football competition staged in Hobart, Tasmania over eighteen (18) roster rounds and four (4) finals series matches between 13 April and 28 September 1957.

New Town District Football Club relocated from the New Town Oval to KGV Park in Glenorchy from this season and absorbed the already existing Glenorchy Rovers club that was participating in the Southern District Football Association at that time, the name change to Glenorchy District Football Club was approved by the TANFL on 8 April 1957. 
The KGV Memorial Park (as it was then known) was extensively renovated and opened for use for TANFL football on 4 May by Glenorchy Municipal Council Warden, Mr J.E Percey and by Mr Eric O'Brien, the oldest surviving player from the Glenorchy Rovers team of 1886.

Participating Clubs
Clarence District Football Club
Glenorchy District Football Club
Hobart Football Club
New Norfolk District Football Club
North Hobart Football Club
Sandy Bay Football Club

1957 TANFL Club Coaches
Stuart Spencer (Clarence)
Jack Rough (Glenorchy)
Bill Williams (Hobart)
Rex Garwood (New Norfolk)
John Leedham (North Hobart)
Gordon Bowman (Sandy Bay)

TANFL Reserves Grand Final
Glenorchy 10.19 (79) v Nth Hobart 5.11 (41) – North Hobart Oval

TANFL Under-19's Grand Final
State Schools Old Boys Football Association (SSOBFA) 
Glenorchy 9.11 (65) v Macalburn 9.4 (58) – New Town Oval

State Grand Final
(Saturday, 5 October 1957) 
Longford: 3.8 (26) | 5.11 (41) | 10.13 (73) | 14.16 (100)
Nth Hobart: 0.1 (1) | 7.4 (46) | 10.5 (65) | 12.7 (79)
Attendance: 12,500 at York Park

Intrastate Matches
Intrastate Match (Monday, 17 June 1957) 
 NTFA 16.20 (116) v TANFL 16.15 (111) – Att: 11,776 at North Hobart Oval

Interstate Matches
Interstate Match (Saturday, 20 July 1957) 
Victoria 15.17 (107) v Tasmania 13.14 (92) – Att: 16,721 at North Hobart Oval

Interstate Match (Saturday, 27 July 1957) 
South Australia 19.13 (127) v Tasmania 17.10 (112) – Att: 14,477 at North Hobart Oval

Leading Goalkickers: TANFL
 Ian Westell (Sandy Bay) – 67
 Noel Clarke (North Hobart) – 66
 Stuart Spencer (Clarence) – 54
 Joe Brown (New Norfolk) – 44
 Brian Eade (Glenorchy) – 43

Medal Winners
Trevor Leo (Hobart) – William Leitch Medal
Bruce Burn (Clarence) & Alan Gould (North Hobart) – George Watt Medal (Reserves)
Russell Newell (Clarence) – V.A Geard Medal (Under-19's)
Paddy Cooper (North Hobart) – Weller Arnold Medal (Best TANFL player in Intrastate match)

1957 TANFL Ladder

Round 1
(Saturday, 13 April. Saturday, 20 April & Monday, 22 April 1957) 
Glenorchy 12.10 (82) v New Norfolk 8.9 (57) – Att: 5,879 at North Hobart Oval (13 April)
Clarence 16.17 (113) v Sandy Bay 15.10 (100) – Att: 7,193 at North Hobart Oval (20 April)
Nth Hobart 12.11 (83) v Hobart 10.8 (68) – Att: 6,096 at North Hobart Oval (22 April)

Round 2
(Saturday, 27 April 1957) 
Hobart 7.14 (56) v New Norfolk 5.17 (47) – Att: 2,577 at North Hobart Oval
Sandy Bay 10.15 (75) v Nth Hobart 10.13 (73) – Att: 2,906 at Queenborough Oval
Glenorchy 8.12 (60) v Clarence 6.18 (54) – Att: 3,239 at Bellerive Oval

Round 3
(Saturday, 4 May 1957) 
Nth Hobart 12.24 (96) v Clarence 10.12 (72) – Att: 5,387 at North Hobart Oval
Hobart 12.8 (80) v Glenorchy 10.14 (74) – Att: 2,665 at KGV Park *
Sandy Bay 14.12 (96) v New Norfolk 13.16 (94) – Att: 2,258 at Boyer Oval
Note: First official TANFL match played at KGV Park.

Round 4
(Saturday, 11 May 1957) 
Hobart 17.13 (115) v Sandy Bay 13.13 (91) – Att: 3,642 at North Hobart Oval
New Norfolk 13.17 (95) v Clarence 10.12 (72) – Att: 1,760 at Bellerive Oval
Glenorchy 12.9 (81) v Nth Hobart 8.14 (62) – Att: 3,751 at KGV Park

Round 5
(Saturday, 18 May 1957) 
New Norfolk 16.12 (108) v Nth Hobart 14.13 (97) – Att: 4,191 at North Hobart Oval
Glenorchy 20.14 (134) v Sandy Bay 15.20 (110) – Att: 3,371 at KGV Park
Hobart 12.12 (84) v Clarence 10.20 (80) – Att: 1,829 at Bellerive Oval

Round 6
(Saturday, 25 May 1957) 
Nth Hobart 21.16 (142) v Hobart 9.15 (69) – Att: 5,120 at North Hobart Oval
Sandy Bay 15.11 (101) v Clarence 14.13 (97) – Att: 2,455 at Queenborough Oval
New Norfolk 16.16 (112) v Glenorchy 15.13 (103) – Att: 2,925 at Boyer Oval

Round 7
(Saturday, 1 June 1957) 
Sandy Bay 12.9 (81) v North Hobart 10.17 (77) – Att: 5,283 at North Hobart Oval
Glenorchy 13.19 (97) v Clarence 12.12 (84) – Att: 3,191 at KGV Park
New Norfolk 16.15 (111) v Hobart 8.11 (59) – Att: 2,040 at Boyer Oval

Round 8
(Saturday, 8 June 1957) 
Glenorchy 12.15 (87) v Hobart 11.12 (78) – Att: 4,024 at North Hobart Oval
Sandy Bay 16.13 (109) v New Norfolk 13.14 (92) – Att: 3,800 at Queenborough Oval
Nth Hobart 12.12 (84) v Clarence 11.10 (76) – Att: 2,706 at Bellerive Oval

Round 9
(Saturday, 15 June 1957) 
Nth Hobart 17.13 (115) v Glenorchy 12.13 (85) – Att: 5,876 at North Hobart Oval
Hobart 11.17 (83) v Sandy Bay 8.10 (58) – Att: 2,224 at Queenborough Oval
Clarence 16.5 (101) v New Norfolk 15.10 (100) – Att: 2,289 at Bellerive Oval

Round 10
(Saturday, 22 June 1957) 
Hobart 13.19 (97) v Clarence 14.11 (95) – Att: 3,564 at North Hobart Oval
Glenorchy 17.14 (116) v Sandy Bay 10.14 (74) – Att: 2,723 at Queenborough Oval
Nth Hobart 15.17 (107) v New Norfolk 5.12 (42) – Att: 2,793 at Boyer Oval

Round 11
(Saturday, 29 June 1957) 
Nth Hobart 15.10 (100) v Hobart 11.20 (86) – Att: 4,500 at North Hobart Oval
Glenorchy 15.7 (97) v New Norfolk 13.8 (86) – Att: 3,232 at KGV Park
Clarence 14.14 (98) v Sandy Bay 10.8 (68) – Att: 2,440 at Bellerive Oval

Round 12
(Saturday, 6 July 1957) 
Hobart 16.9 (105) v New Norfolk 15.10 (100) – Att: 3,425 at North Hobart Oval
Nth Hobart 14.13 (97) v Sandy Bay 13.9 (87) – Att: 2,763 at Queenborough Oval
Clarence 10.20 (80) v Glenorchy 12.8 (80) – Att: 3,280 at Bellerive Oval

Round 13
(Saturday, 13 July 1957) 
Nth Hobart 18.21 (129) v Clarence 11.11 (77) – Att: 5,215 at North Hobart Oval
Hobart 12.10 (82) v Glenorchy 9.12 (66) – Att: 2,882 at KGV Park
Sandy Bay 15.11 (101) v New Norfolk 14.12 (96) – Att: 2,395 at Boyer Oval

Round 14
(Saturday, 3 August 1957) 
Glenorchy 10.12 (72) v Nth Hobart 8.8 (56) – Att: 3,134 at North Hobart Oval
Hobart 16.16 (112) v Sandy Bay 11.13 (79) – Att: 3,035 at Queenborough Oval
New Norfolk 11.7 (73) v Clarence 7.12 (54) – Att: 2,016 at Boyer Oval

Round 15
(Saturday, 10 August 1957) 
Nth Hobart 10.21 (81) v New Norfolk 12.6 (78) – Att: 3,159 at North Hobart Oval
Glenorchy 15.16 (106) v Sandy Bay 13.12 (90) – Att: 2,086 at KGV Park
Clarence 8.11 (59) v Hobart 5.9 (39) – Att: 1,226 at Bellerive Oval

Round 16
(Saturday, 17 August 1957) 
Nth Hobart 15.16 (106) v Hobart 14.14 (98) – Att: 4,063 at North Hobart Oval
Sandy Bay 15.18 (108) v Clarence 10.12 (72) – Att: 2,352 at Queenborough Oval
Glenorchy 13.13 (91) v New Norfolk 7.14 (56) – Att: 2,116 at Boyer Oval

Round 17
(Saturday, 24 August 1957) 
Nth Hobart 20.25 (145) v Sandy Bay 8.9 (57) – Att: 5,031 at North Hobart Oval
Glenorchy 13.13 (91) v Clarence 12.16 (88) – Att: 1,820 at KGV Park
Hobart 16.14 (110) v New Norfolk 10.17 (77) – Att: 1,630 at Boyer Oval

Round 18
(Saturday, 31 August 1957) 
Glenorchy 25.13 (163) v Hobart 11.14 (80) – Att: 2,529 at North Hobart Oval
Sandy Bay 16.12 (108) v New Norfolk 11.14 (80) – Att: 3,221 at Queenborough Oval
Nth Hobart 12.11 (83) v Clarence 10.14 (74) – Att: 1,458 at Bellerive Oval

First Semi Final
(Saturday, 7 September 1957) 
Hobart: 2.3 (15) | 6.9 (45) | 9.10 (64) | 18.13 (121)
Sandy Bay: 5.5 (35) | 9.8 (62) | 14.11 (95) | 15.14 (104)
Attendance: 8,460 at North Hobart Oval

Second Semi Final
(Saturday, 14 September 1957) 
Nth Hobart: 1.5 (11) | 2.11 (23) | 8.12 (60) | 12.13 (85)
Glenorchy: 0.2 (2) | 1.2 (8) | 2.3 (15) | 2.4 (16)
Attendance: 7,764 at North Hobart Oval

Preliminary Final
(Saturday, 21 September 1957) 
Glenorchy: 4.2 (26) | 10.7 (67) | 13.12 (90) | 16.17 (113)
Hobart: 4.3 (27) | 7.6 (48) | 11.8 (74) | 15.9 (99)
Attendance: 9,842 at North Hobart Oval

Grand Final
(Saturday, 28 September 1957) 
Nth Hobart: 0.6 (6) | 5.9 (39) | 8.10 (58) | 11.15 (81)
Glenorchy: 1.5 (11) | 1.8 (14) | 7.14 (56) | 9.15 (69)
Attendance: 16,363 at North Hobart Oval

Source: All scores and statistics courtesy of the Hobart Mercury and Saturday Evening Mercury (SEM) publications.

Tasmanian Football League seasons